Lydia Frances Polgreen (born 1975) is an American journalist. She is best known for having been the editor-in-chief of HuffPost. She also spent about one year between 2021 and 2022 as the head of content for Gimlet Media. Prior to that she was editorial director of NYT Global at The New York Times, and the West Africa bureau chief for the same publication, based in Dakar, Senegal, from 2005 to 2009. She won many awards, most recently the Livingston award in 2009. She also reported from India. She was then based in Johannesburg, South Africa where she was The New York Times Johannesburg Bureau Chief.

After leaving Gimlet, she returned to The New York Times as an opinion columnist.

Biography
Polgreen graduated from St. John's College in 1997 and Columbia University Graduate School of Journalism in 2000.

She started working at The New York Times in 2002.

In 2006, she received a George Polk Award in Foreign Reporting from Long Island University for her coverage of ethnic violence in the Darfur region of Sudan.

In February 2008, she covered the Battle of N'Djamena in Chad. Some of her work in N’Djamena was illustrated by the French freelance photographer Benedicte Kurzen.

In April 2016, she became the editorial director of NYT Global for The New York Times. On December 6, 2016, she left The New York Times to succeed the founder of The Huffington Post, Arianna Huffington, as editor-in-chief.

In 2021, she was named to Fast Company's Queer 50 list.

Personal life
Polgreen is married to Candace Feit, a documentary photographer. In November 2017, Polgreen was nominated to Out magazine's "OUT100" for 2017 in recognition of her work and her visibility.

References

Further reading

External links

"WEBCAST: LYDIA POLGREEN, NEW NYT NEW DELHI CORRESPONDENT", MARCH 30, 2009
"Lydia Polgreen, NYT's West Africa bureau chief", Columbia Journalism podcast, 1/7/2009
"My Foreign Correspondent Hero: Lydia Polgreen", AAUW Dialog, March 13, 2009

1975 births
Living people
Columbia University Graduate School of Journalism alumni
American women journalists
The New York Times writers
George Polk Award recipients
Place of birth missing (living people)
St. John's College (Annapolis/Santa Fe) alumni
American LGBT journalists
Livingston Award winners for International Reporting
21st-century American journalists
21st-century American women